Stare Skoszewy  is a village in the administrative district of Gmina Nowosolna, within Łódź East County, Łódź Voivodeship, in central Poland.

The village has an approximate population of 180.

References

 Central Statistical Office (GUS) Population: Size and Structure by Administrative Division - (2007-12-31) (in Polish) 

Stare Skoszewy